André Georges Poplimont (18 April 1893 – 27 February 1973) was a Belgian ice hockey player and fencer. As a hockey player he won a bronze medal at the 1924 European Championships and finished seventh at the 1924 Winter Olympics. As a fencer he placed fourth in the team épée event at the 1932 Summer Olympics.

References

External links
 

1893 births
1973 deaths
Belgian épée fencers
Belgian male fencers
Fencers at the 1932 Summer Olympics
Ice hockey players at the 1924 Winter Olympics
Olympic fencers of Belgium
Olympic ice hockey players of Belgium
Sportspeople from Antwerp